This is a list of people elected Fellow of the Royal Society in 1960.

Fellows 

Alfred Maurice Binnie
Robert Hanbury Brown
Sir Derman Guy Christopherson
Richard Henry Dalitz
James Norman Davidson
Michael James Stewart Dewar
Sir William Stewart Duke-Elder
Louis Essen
Sir David Gwynne Evans
Norman Leslie Falcon
Peter Alfred Gorer
Oscar Victor Sayer Heath
Sir Ronald Holroyd
Hugh Esmor Huxley
Sir John Cowdery Kendrew
John Alwyne Kitching
David Keith Chalmers Macdonald
Sir George White Pickering
George Porter, Baron Porter of Luddenham
Klaus Friedrich Roth
Thiruvenkata Rajendra Seshadri
James Haward Taylor
Albert Alan Townsend
Ralph Louis Wain
Edward Nevill Willmer

Foreign members

George Wells Beadle
Ragnar Arthur Granit
George Bogdan Kistiakowsky
Lev Davydovitch Landau

1960
1960 in science
1960 in the United Kingdom